España—endonymously—is Spain, a country in southwestern Europe.

España may also refer to:

Arts and entertainment
España (Chabrier), an 1883 orchestral piece
España, a derivative 1886 waltz by Émile Waldteufel
España 1936, a Spanish documentary film

Places
España Lake, Bolivia
España Boulevard, Philippines
España railway station, Philippines
 España, a light rail station in Guadalajara, Mexico

Political parties
España 2000, Spain

Ships
s of the Spanish Navy
 (1913–1923)
 (later España, 1915–1937)

Sports teams
Real C.D. España, Honduras
España F.C., El Salvador
Club España, United States

See also
Spain (disambiguation)
Español (disambiguation)
Spanish (disambiguation)
Espanola (disambiguation)